Lemonia ballioni is a species of moth of the family Brahmaeidae (older classifications placed it in Lemoniidae). It was described by Hugo Theodor Christoph in 1888. The range includes Turkey, Ukraine and Russia.

References

Brahmaeidae
Moths described in 1888
Insects of Turkey